Rupert Bertram Mitford, 6th Baron Redesdale, Baron Mitford (born 18 July 1967), is a British hereditary peer, Liberal Democrat politician and member of the prominent Mitford family.

Biography 
Mitford was educated at Milton Abbey and Highgate School, before going up to Newcastle University, where he graduated with the degree of BA.

He succeeded his father as the 6th Baron Redesdale, of Redesdale in the County of Northumberland, in 1991.

Following the removal of hereditary peers' automatic right to a seat in Parliament by the House of Lords Act 1999, the Liberal Democrats took advantage of an offer from the New Labour Government for some of their hereditary peers to return to the House as working peers. Redesdale was created a life peer on 18 April 2000, as Baron Mitford, of Redesdale in the County of Northumberland. At the age of 32, he was the youngest person ever to receive a life peerage. By convention, the House of Lords refer to peers holding multiple titles by whichever is senior within the peerage. Thus Mitford is known in the House as Lord Redesdale.

He is a first cousin once removed of the famous Mitford sisters, daughters of the 2nd Baron Redesdale. The youngest of the sisters, Deborah, Duchess of Devonshire, was, with her husband, the 11th Duke, active in the Social Democratic Party. This later merged with the Liberal Party to become the Liberal Democrats, for whom Redesdale sits in the House of Lords.

Career 
He has spoken on various issues on behalf of the Liberal Democrats Parliamentary Party, such as the environment, international development, and science and technology. He is patron of various societies, including one encouraged by his parliamentary colleagues, namely the Red Squirrel Protection Partnership, which advocates strict control of the grey squirrel population so as to enhance the chance of red squirrels' survival.

Lord Redesdale was the Energy Spokesman for the Liberal Democrats for the House of Lords 2000-2008. In 2009 he founded the Anaerobic Digestion and Biogas Association.

Redesdale is currently the CEO of the Carbon Management Association and the Energy Managers Association. Since 2012, Redesdale has been founding Chairman of the Carbon Management Association and of the Energy Managers Association.

In November 2013, he, along with Jason Franks (formerly of the Daily Mail and General Trust events division), founded Heelec, which launched the Energy Management Exhibition (EMEX). The show attracts over 4,500 professionals from the Energy Managers Association's 25,000-large community.

Personal life
He lives with his wife, Helen (née Shipsey), Lady Redesdale, who is a lawyer, and four children near Tufnell Park, north London, as well as in Northumberland.

The heir apparent to the title is the Hon. Bertram Mitford, born in 2000.

Lord Redesdale is a lifelong supporter of Arsenal FC.

Arms

See also
Baron Redesdale
List of members of the House of Lords

Notes

References

External links
 Hansard entry
 Debrett's People of Today
 The Energy Managers Association
 The Energy Management Exhibition
 

1967 births
Living people
Rupert
English environmentalists
Rupert
People educated at Highgate School
Mitford
Liberal Democrats (UK) hereditary peers
Mitford
Life peers created by Elizabeth II
Redesdale